Two of Us is a 2019 French romantic drama film directed by Filippo Meneghetti. It was selected as the French entry for the Best International Feature Film at the 93rd Academy Awards, making the shortlist of fifteen films.

Plot
Two elderly women, who are neighbours, have also been lovers for decades, and plan to move to Rome. Things go wrong when one of them has a stroke and becomes mute and paralyzed, and is unable to tell her family the truth about her relationship.

Cast
 Barbara Sukowa as Nina Dorn
 Martine Chevallier as Madeleine Girard
 Léa Drucker as Anne
 Jérôme Varanfrain as Frédéric
 Muriel Bénazéraf as Muriel
 Augustin Reynes as Théo

Reception
The website's critics consensus reads: "A remarkable feature debut for director/co-writer Filippo Meneghetti, Two of Us tells a deceptively complex love story while presenting a rich acting showcase for its three leads." According to Metacritic, which sampled 20 critics and calculated a weighted average score of 82 out of 100, the film received "universal acclaim."

See also
 List of submissions to the 93rd Academy Awards for Best International Feature Film
 List of French submissions for the Academy Award for Best International Feature Film

References

External links
 

2019 films
2019 drama films
2019 romantic drama films
2010s French-language films
2019 LGBT-related films
Belgian LGBT-related films
Fictional LGBT couples
French drama films
French LGBT-related films
2010s German-language films
Lesbian-related films
Luxembourgian LGBT-related films
LGBT-related drama films
2019 multilingual films
Belgian multilingual films
French multilingual films
2010s French films

French romantic drama films
Belgian romantic drama films
Luxembourgian romantic drama films